The Angle Ring Company Limited is an engineering firm based in Tipton, West Midlands, England. It was founded in 1951 at a site in Bloomfield Road, and has since expanded to become one of the most prominent steel benders / curvers of metal and alloys in its market. By 1980, it was Britain's largest steel bending firm and ten years later was exporting its goods to foreign markets.

External links

An Angle ring is a companion flange which is made out of angle iron.  Angle Iron is rolled into a complete ring and the joint on the ring is welded to make the ring one solid piece.  Usually angle rings have holes punched in the outer leg so they can bolt up to another ring or a fitting such as an elbow, an expansion joint or a fan or blower.  These rings go on to round heavy duty duct work, typically made out of spiral pipe or single longitudinal pipe also known as blow pipe.  Angle rings are components in air systems where movement of air or movement of material by air is done.  They are used in pollution control systems, agricultural equipment such as grain handling and a multitude of other applications.  The largest manufacturer and leader of stock and special angle rings in the United States is Midwest Metal Products located in Michigan City Indiana.

Engineering companies of England
Companies based in the West Midlands (county)
Tipton
Manufacturing companies established in 1951
1951 establishments in England